Grandview or Grand View may refer to:

Buildings and institutions
Grand View Hotel, a hotel in the Brisbane suburb of Cleveland, Queensland, Australia
Grand View University, a Lutheran college in Des Moines, Iowa, US
Grandview High School (Colorado), a school in Aurora, Colorado, US
Grandview Hotel, Fairfield, a hotel in the Melbourne suburb of Fairfield, Victoria, Australia
Grandview Medical Center, a hospital located in Dayton, Ohio, US

Parks
Grand View Park, a park in the Inner Sunset District, San Francisco, California
Grand View Scenic Byway Park, former name for Emerald View Park, Pittsburgh, Pennsylvania
Grandview Drive, a road and park in Peoria and Peoria Heights, Illinois

Places

Canada 

 Grandview, Alberta
 Grandview, Manitoba
 Grandview Municipality, Manitoba
 Rural Municipality of Grandview, a former rural municipality in Manitoba
 Rural Municipality of Grandview No. 349, a currently existing rural municipality in Saskatchewan
 Grandview, Prince Edward Island, a small community in eastern Prince Edward Island
 Grandview–Woodland, a neighbourhood in Vancouver, British Columbia

United States 

Grand View, Idaho
Grandview, Illinois
Grandview, Indiana
Grandview, Iowa
Grandview, Missouri
Grand View-on-Hudson, New York, often simply called Grand View
Grandview, Hamilton County, Ohio
Grandview, Washington County, Ohio
Grandview, Oklahoma
Grandview, Texas
Grandview, Washington
Grandview, West Virginia
Grandview, Wisconsin, a town
Grand View, Wisconsin, an unincorporated community
Grand View Estates, Colorado
Grandview Heights, Ohio
Grand View Mountain, another name for Snake Mountain
Grandview Plaza, Kansas, a city
Grandview Township (disambiguation)

Other uses
 Grandview, the fictional town in which much of the CBS series Ghost Whisperer takes place
 GrandView (software), an outliner software package no longer supported by Symantec

See also 
 Grandview, U.S.A., a 1984 comedy/drama film
 Grandview Cemetery (disambiguation)
 Grandview High School (disambiguation)
 SS Granview, former name of the SS Empire Chamois